The Independent Movement for the National Reconstruction / Party of the Portuguese Right (MIRN-PDP) was a Portuguese political party. It became an official political party on 7 March 1979 and was officially dissolved on 12 June 1997 (Acórdão 674/97 of the Constitutional Court) as it was found to be inactive since 30 June 1984. It took part in only one election, the 1980 legislative election, as a part of a coalition of right-wing parties, but failed to win any seats.

History 

The party was created, as a political movement, in 1977. It became an official political party on 7 March 1979. It was led by president General Káulza de Arriaga, and vice-president Jorge Morais Barbosa.

Before the 1980 legislative election, the MIRN-PDP first attempted to take part in the Democratic Alliance, but was turned down. It instead joined a coalition with the Christian Democratic Party and a movement called National Front, but the coalition performed worse than when the Christian Democratic Party ran alone in the 1979 legislative election (23,819 in 1980 vs. 72,514 in 1979).

PNR's leader José Pinto Coelho took part in MIRN manifestations in 1980.

Election Results

Assembly of the Republic

References 

Defunct political parties in Portugal
Political parties established in 1979
1979 establishments in Portugal